The 1998 Clásica de San Sebastián was the 18th edition of the Clásica de San Sebastián cycle race and was held on 8 August 1998. The race started and finished in San Sebastián. The race was won by Francesco Casagrande of the Cofidis team.

General classification

References

Clásica de San Sebastián
San
Clasica De San Sebastian
August 1998 sports events in Europe